Scott Oudsema and Phillip Simmonds were the defending champions, but only Scott Oudsema competed that year with Brendan Evans.

Brendan Evans and Scott Oudsema won in the final 6–1, 6–1 against David Galić and David Jeflea.

Seeds

Draw

Finals

Top half

Bottom half

References

Boys' Doubles
2004 Boys' Doubles